Cry for Me may refer to:

 "Cry for Me" (Camila Cabello song), 2019
 "Cry for Me" (Twice song), 2020

Other uses
 Cry for Me, Billy, a 1972 American film by William A. Graham

See also
 Cry for You (disambiguation)